Bamboo snake may refer to:

 Pseudoxenodon bambusicola, a colubrid snake found in China, Vietnam, Laos, and Thailand.
 Trimeresurus gramineus, a.k.a. the bamboo pit viper, a venomous species found only in southern India.
 Tropidolaemus wagleri, a.k.a. Wagler's pit viper, a venomous species native to southeast Asia.
 Trimeresurus stejnegeri, a.k.a. the Chinese green tree viper, a venomous pitviper species found in India Nepal, Burma, Thailand, China and Taiwan.

Animal common name disambiguation pages